Mount Picton is a mountain of Southwest National Park located in Tasmania, Australia.

References

Mountains of Tasmania